Major General Bruce Brealey CB (born 8 February 1959) is a British Army officer who served as Deputy Commanding General of the Multi-National Corps – Iraq from 2007 to 2008.

Military career
Educated at St Olave's Grammar School in Orpington, Brealey was commissioned into the Royal Artillery in 1984. He became Commander, Royal Artillery in December 2002, Assistant Chief of Staff, Plans at the Ministry of Defence in January 2005 and Deputy Commanding General of the Multi-National Corps – Iraq in October 2007. He went on to be General Officer Commanding, Theatre Troops in November 2008 and Director-General, Capability in November 2011. He was made a companion of the Order of the Bath in 2012.

References

|-

1959 births
British Army major generals
Companions of the Order of the Bath
Living people
Royal Artillery officers
People educated at St Olave's Grammar School
British Army personnel of the Iraq War